Iain Sharp (born 1953 in Glasgow) is a New Zealand poet and critic.

Sharp emigrated with his family to New Zealand in 1961, where they settled in Auckland. He studied at Auckland University where he received a doctorate in English in 1982. His doctoral thesis was titled Wit at several weapons: a critical edition. Soon after completing his PhD he qualified as a librarian from the New Zealand Library School.
He currently works part-time in the Special Collections Department of Auckland Central City Library, and is also a reviewer, critic and columnist for the New Zealand Listener magazine.

Works
 Why Mammals Shiver, Auckland: One Eyed Press, 1981
 She Is Trying to Kidnap the Blind Person, Auckland: Hard Echo Press, 1985
 The Pierrot Variations, Auckland: Hard Echo Press, 1985
 Two Poets: Selections from the Work of Suzanne Chapman and Iain Sharp, edited by Suzanne Chapman, Auckland: Auckland English Association, 1985
 The Singing Harp, Paekakariki: Earl of Seacliff Art Workshop, 2004
 Real Gold: treasures of Auckland City Libraries, text by Iain Sharp; photographs by Haruhiko Sameshima, Auckland University Press, 2007
 Our Favourite Poems: New Zealanders choose their best-loved poems, introduction by Iain Sharp, Craig Potton Publishing, 2007, 
 Heaphy: Explorer, Artist, Settler, Auckland University Press, 2008
 Sharing Our Ghosts, Poems by Joy MacKenzie & Iain Sharp, Auckland: Cumberland Press, 2011

References

1953 births
Living people
New Zealand poets
New Zealand male poets
University of Auckland alumni
New Zealand people of Scottish descent